The Cape Cross thick-toed gecko (Pachydactylus kochii), also known commonly as Koch's gecko and Koch's thick-toed gecko, is a species of gecko, a lizard in the family Gekkonidae. The species is endemic to southern Africa.

Etymology
The specific name, kochii, is in honor of Austrian-born South African entomologist Charles Koch.

Geographic range
P. kochi is found in Namibia and in South Africa (southern Namaqualand).

Description
The body is slender. Dorsally, the ground color is grayish with a lavender tinge, and there are five reddish-brown crossbands. Ventrally it is white.

Reproduction
P. kochii is oviparous.

References

Further reading
FitzSimons V (1959). "Some new reptiles from southern Africa and southern Angola". Annals of the Transvaal Museum 23: 405–409. (Pachydactylus kochii, new species, p. 405).
Bauer AM, Lamb T (2005). "Phylogenetic relationships of southern African geckos in the Pachydactylus group (Squamata: Gekkonidae)". African Journal of Herpetology 54 (2): 105–129. (Colopus kochii, new combination, p. 105).

kochii
Reptiles described in 1959